"Passion" is the seventeenth episode of the second season of the fantasy-horror television series Buffy the Vampire Slayer (1997-2003). The episode was written by Ty King and directed by Michael Gershman, who served as the show's cinematographer. It originally aired on The WB Television Network in the United States on February 24, 1998.

The premise of Buffy the Vampire Slayer is that an adolescent girl, Buffy Summers, is chosen by mystical forces and given superhuman powers to kill vampires, demons, and other evil creatures in the fictional town of Sunnydale. She is supported by a close circle of friends, nicknamed the Scooby Gang. In "Passion", Buffy attempts to protect herself and her close ones from Angelus and his murderous intent as Jenny Calendar continues to search for a spell to restore his soul.

In 2014, British singer Ed Sheeran sampled the episode's background theme "Remembering Jenny" for his song "Afire Love".

Plot
Buffy wakes to find an envelope on her pillow containing a charcoal drawing of herself sleeping. Buffy asks Giles if there is a spell to reverse Angel's invitation into her house.

Buffy explains to her mother that she has been having problems with Angel, whom she describes as an abusive ex-boyfriend. Later that night, Willow discovers that Angelus has been in her room too, leaving behind a sick gift of her dead goldfish hanging from a fishing line. Drusilla has a vision showing someone attempting to break up the newly reunited vampire family. Jenny goes to a Gypsy novelty shop to buy an Orb of Thesulah.

Buffy confronts Jenny and explains that Giles misses her. Giles tells Buffy that he has found a ritual to revoke a vampire's invitation. Joyce finds Angelus waiting for her in the front yard. He starts to follow her into the house, but is unable to cross the threshold. Willow is shown reciting the ritual, and Buffy shuts the door in his face.

When Giles finds Jenny working late at the school, he invites her to call at his house when she has finished. Jenny completes her translation of a ritual's text that, along with the Orb of Thesulah, will restore Angelus' soul. She jumps when she notices Angelus sitting in the dark at the back of the room. He smashes the Orb of Thesulah and snaps Jenny's neck.

Giles returns home to find the place decorated in a romantic setting with candles, wine and rose petals. As Giles follows the trail he finds Jenny's lifeless body. Angelus lurks outside Buffy's house and watches with glee as a devastated Buffy and Willow are informed of Jenny's death over the phone. Giles returns to his apartment to arm for battle.

At the factory, there is an explosive crash as the long dining table erupts in flame. Angelus, Drusilla, and Spike recoil and move to escape. Giles attacks Angelus with a flaming baseball bat. Angelus grabs him by the throat and lifts him clear off the floor as Buffy enters the fray. She breaks Giles free of Angelus' grasp and fights Angelus, but is distracted by the unconscious Giles, now completely surrounded by flames. As Angelus makes his escape, Buffy jumps down and half-carries Giles from the building.

Later that night, Buffy apologizes for not being able to kill Angelus when she had the chance. The next day at the school, as Willow sets her books on the desk, the backup disk containing the translated ritual slides and falls into the narrow space between the desk and a filing cabinet.

Themes
According to Noel Murray from The A.V. Club, a recurring theme in "Passion" is "the common feeling of being left out".

References

External links

Buffy the Vampire Slayer (season 2) episodes
1998 American television episodes
Television episodes about murder
Television episodes about violence against women